Yordan Sokolov, (Bulgarian: Йордан Соколов) sometimes spelled as Jordan Sokolov (18 January 1933 – 24 February 2016) was a Bulgarian jurist and politician, Minister of Internal affairs from 1991 to 1992, three mandates as an MP from January 1995 to June 2005, and Speaker (Bulgarian: председател) of Parliament from 1997 to 2001.

He was a graduate of the juridical faculty of Sofia University.

In 2004 together with Ivan Kostov and other MPs Sokolov founded DSB, but in 2005 he left the political scene and returned to lawyer practice. In 2011 he left his posts at DSP and resigned from membership because of the party's united political activities with the Socialists.

He was married to Prof. Eva Sokolova with two daughters until his death in 2016.

Awards 
 Order of the Elephant (Denmark)
 Royal Order of the Seraphim (Sweden) 
 Great Cross of The Holy Tomb Order of the Jerusalem patriarchy
 Order of Saints Cyril and Methodius

References

External links
 Yordan Sokolov Remains Chairman, Standart, 13 April 2001
 Yordan Sokolov - jurist, politician, statesman

Chairpersons of the National Assembly of Bulgaria
Government ministers of Bulgaria
Politicians from Sofia
Sofia University alumni
1933 births
2016 deaths